Cardinale Stadium is a soccer-specific stadium on the campus of California State University, Monterey Bay in Seaside, California. It is the home of Monterey Bay FC of the USL Championship.

History
The venue opened in 1951 as Freeman Stadium. It hosted the Fort Ord Warriors, a semi-pro football team made up of servicemen from Fort Ord. In the 1950s they played such teams as the Los Angeles Rams and the San Francisco 49ers. Fort Ord was closed in 1994 and some of the land, including the stadium, became the home of California State University, Monterey Bay.

Ground breaking for the stadium renovations took place on September 16, 2021. The team entered into a multi-year partnership with the Cardinale Automotive Group for the stadium naming rights. Thus, the venue was renamed Cardinale Stadium.

The stadium opened on May 7, 2022, when Monterey Bay defeated Las Vegas Lights FC 1–0 on a goal by Walmer Martinez in the 56th minute.

References

Sports venues completed in 2022
Soccer venues in California
Monterey Bay FC
USL Championship stadiums
2022 establishments in California